The Allamakee Community School District (also known as ACSD) is a public school district based in the city of Waukon in Allamakee County, Iowa, United States.
The district is mainly in Allamakee County, with a small portion in Winneshiek County. It serves the cities of Waukon, Harpers Ferry, and Waterville, and the surrounding rural areas.

History
Because of budget cuts, 26 teachers' positions were terminated in 2009.

Jay Mathis was hired as Superintendent in 2018. Mathis is an alumnus of the district, and previously served as Superintendent at Eldora–New Providence Community School District.

List of schools
The district operates four schools, all in Waukon:
East Campus Elementary School
West Campus Elementary School
Waukon Middle School
Waukon High School

References

External links
 
 District administration

See also
List of school districts in Iowa

School districts in Iowa
Education in Allamakee County, Iowa
Education in Winneshiek County, Iowa